Bergsgrav Station is a railway station located in the village of Vinne in the municipality of Verdal in Trøndelag county, Norway.  The station is located on the Nordland Line, and serves the southern Vinne suburb of Verdal.  The station is only served by the Trøndelag Commuter Rail service between Steinkjer and Trondheim.

There has been a station here since 1938, but the current station was built on 6 December 1977.

References

External links
Information about the station at Bane NOR

Railway stations in Verdal
Railway stations on the Nordland Line
Railway stations opened in 1977
1977 establishments in Norway